Ajin Tom (born 29 January 2000) is an Indian professional footballer who plays as a defender for Muthoot FA in Kerala Premier League.

Career

Earlier career
Ajin represented Kerala State once in 2013, where they finished Runners-Up. From there he was selected immediately for the national side. He was part of the India U-16 team which finished runners-up in the 2015 SAFF U-16 Championship, losing to Bangladesh U16 in the final on penalties.
Ajin was part of the AIFF Elite Academy batch that was preparing for the 2017 FIFA U-17 World Cup to be hosted in India.

Indian Arrows
Ajin Tom made his professional debut for the I-League side Indian Arrows. He play first match of the 2019-20 season against Gokulam Kerala F.C. He started match and was replaced by Hendry Antonay in 75th minute as Indian Arrows lost 0–1.

Gokulam Kerala
On 23 October 2020 , Ajin joined I-League club Gokulam Kerala FC on a season long contract.

Career statistics

References

External links 
 AIFF profile

2000 births
Living people
People from Wayanad district
Indian footballers
Indian Arrows players
Gokulam Kerala FC players
Footballers from Kerala
I-League players
India youth international footballers
Association football defenders